Thomas Peter Keenan (1866–1927), from  Castletownroche, County Cork, Ireland, is the composer of such songs as "The Boys From The County Armagh", "A Mother's Love's A Blessing" and "The Old Rustic Bridge by the Mill." His songs have been widely recorded, most recently by Louise Morrisey, Foster and Allen and Daniel O'Donnell.

He is buried in Castletownroche.

References

1866 births
1927 deaths
Irish songwriters
People from County Cork
19th-century Irish people